Huoqiu County is a county in the west of Anhui Province, People's Republic of China, under the jurisdiction of Lu'an City and bordering Henan province to the west. The government of Huoqiu County is located in Chengguan Town.

Huoqiu County has jurisdiction over 19 towns and 10 townships.

Administrative divisions
In the present, Huoqiu County has 22 towns and 11 townships.
22 Towns

11 Townships

Climate

Transportation
Houqiu County has one passenger railway station, Huoqiu, on the Fuyang–Lu'an railway.

References

External links

 
County-level divisions of Anhui
Lu'an